No Disrespect is a 1994 American memoir written by Sister Souljah.

References

External links
No Disrespect at Google Books

Political memoirs
Hip hop books
English-language books
American memoirs
African-American literature
1994 non-fiction books
Literature by African-American women